Chin of Wa (倭珍), date of birth and death unknown) was a king of Wa in the early 5th century (middle Kofun era). He was also known as Wa Ochin (倭王珍).

San's younger brother and one of the Five kings of Wa. Some compare him to the 18th Emperor Hanzei.

Records

Book of Liang 

 Book of Liang
 In the Book of Liang, the article on Japan states that after the death of the Japanese king "Zan", his younger brother "Ya" stood up, and after his death, his son "Je" stood up.。

History of the Southern Dynasties 
In the Nan shi, the article on the Japanese Kingdom (Nan shi wagu den) describes the contents of the Song Shu Chronicles.

References

参考文献 

 事典類
 
 
 
 坂元義種 「倭の五王」、「珍」。
 
 
  - リンクは朝日新聞社「コトバンク」。
 その他文献

See also 
 Five kings of Wa
 
 Emperor Hanzei

External links 
 漢籍電子文献資料庫 - 台湾中央研究院

Five kings of Wa